Anomala flavilla is a species of shining leaf chafer in the family of beetles known as Scarabaeidae.

Subspecies
These three subspecies belong to the species Anomala flavilla:
 Anomala flavilla centralis LeConte, 1863 c g
 Anomala flavilla coachellae Potts, 1977 i g
 Anomala flavilla flavilla Bates, 1888 i g
Data sources: i = ITIS, c = Catalogue of Life, g = GBIF, b = Bugguide.net

References

Further reading

 

Rutelinae
Articles created by Qbugbot
Beetles described in 1888